Northwest Park (Manchester) is a baseball field located in the northeastern part of Manchester, Connecticut, United States.  The field is the former home of the Manchester Silkworms of the New England Collegiate Baseball League.  It played host to the Silkworms between 2000 and 2009.  The field's location places Union Pond behind a stand of trees located past the outfield.

External links
 Manchester Silkworms website
 NECBL website

Notes

New England Collegiate Baseball League ballparks
Baseball venues in Connecticut
Sports in Manchester, Connecticut